"Eeper Weeper" or "Heeper Peeper" is a popular English nursery rhyme and skipping song that tells the story of a chimney sweep who kills his second wife and hides her body up a chimney. The rhyme has a Roud Folk Song Index number of 13497.

Lyrics
Eeper Weeper, chimney sweeper,
Had a wife but couldn't keep her.
Had another, didn't love her,
Up the chimney he did shove her.

Origins
Iona and Peter Opie noted that the rhyme had been used in this form from at least the first decade of the 20th century. A verse collected from Aberdeen, Scotland and published in 1868 had the words:

Peter, my neeper,
Had a wife,
And he couidna' keep her,
He pat her i' the wa',
And lat a' the mice eat her.

This may be an older version of "Eeper Neeper" and of "Peter Peter Pumpkin Eater".

Notes

English children's songs
English folk songs
English nursery rhymes
Children's games
Fictional murderers
Songs about death
Murder ballads
Skipping rhymes
Traditional children's songs
Songwriter unknown
Year of song unknown